Swansongs is the fourth studio album by New York-based singer/songwriter Chocolate Genius. Swansongs was Chocolate Genius' implied final studio album as he announced he was moving on from music after the album's release, until the 2016 release of Truth vs. Beauty, his fifth album under the name Chocolate Genius. The album was released on September 14, 2010, via One Little Indian Records and NØ FØRMAT!

Track listing 
 She Smiles
 Enough for You
 Like a Nurse
 Kiss Me
 Lump
 Polanski
 How I Write My Songs
 Mr. Wonderful
 Sit & Spin
 When I Lay You Down
 Ready Now

Reception 
While the album has not received much reception as Chocolate Genius has never entered the mainstream or ever received mainstream appeal, the reviews it has received were extremely positive, receiving praise from fans and critics alike.

References

External links

2010 albums
Chocolate Genius, Inc. albums
One Little Independent Records albums